America's Choice is the fifth album by the American blues rock band Hot Tuna, recorded in 1974, and released in 1975 as Grunt BFL1-0820. The album was also released in Quadraphonic as Grunt BFD1-0820. The first of the "Rampage" trilogy albums (the others being Yellow Fever and Hoppkorv) recorded by the now power trio, it marked a major shift in musical direction by the group. With new drummer Bob Steeler, Tuna now performed in a predominantly hard rock style, leaving the earlier band's mixture of electric and acoustic material.

Songs
The album rose to No. 75 on the Billboard charts. One of the tracks is named "Hit Single #1". Despite its title, it was not released as a single.

Cover art
The album cover art depicts a box of laundry detergent, complete with dripping suds, labeled "America's Choice: Hot Tuna".  The lettering and color scheme are loosely based on the style of Tide.  On one side of the detergent box, a contents label lists the musicians as the "active ingredients", and also says, "Pure, unadulterated sounds with amplified additives and the necessary polytonal ingredients to handle heavy loads."  On another side of the box is a "warning" stating, "This album to be played at full volume for maximum effect."
Unedited extended live versions of "Invitation" recorded at the New York York Palladium November 26, 1976, and Santa Clara University May 28, 1977, are available.
In 1996, RCA released the CD box set Hot Tuna in a Can which included a remastered version of this album, along with remasters of the albums Hot Tuna, First Pull Up, Then Pull Down, Burgers, and Hoppkorv.

Track listing
All songs written by Jorma Kaukonen, except where noted.

Personnel
Jorma Kaukonen – guitars, vocals
Jack Casady – bass
Bob Steeler – drums, percussion

Production
Hot Tuna, Fishobaby – producer
Mallory Earl – producer, engineer
Bill Thompson – overseer
Pat Ieraci (Maurice) – production coordinator
Steve Mantoani – recordist
Jeffrey Husband – recordist
Michael Casady – equipment
Frank Mulvey – cover concept
Recorded and Mixed at Wally Heider's Studios, San Francisco
Mastered by Rick Collins, Kendun Recorders, Burbank

References

Hot Tuna albums
1974 albums
Albums recorded at Wally Heider Studios
Grunt Records albums